Vinarce is a town in the municipality of Leskovac, Serbia. According to the 2002 census, the town has a population of 3090 people.

References

Populated places in Jablanica District